Glintt  (Global Intelligent Technologies) is a Portuguese IT company formed after the merging of ParaRede and Consiste. After the merger, it became one of the largest Portuguese technological companies. It operates in Europe, Africa and Latin America and holds a strong position on the Banking, Telecommunications, Health, Trade, Industry and Public Administration sectors.

External links
Official site

References 

Companies based in Lisbon
Software companies established in 2008
Software companies of Portugal
Portuguese brands
Portuguese companies established in 2008